Gareth James Mumford (born 18 June 1982) is a former English cricketer. Mumford is a right-handed batsman who fields as a wicket-keeper. He was born in Bridgnorth, Shropshire.

Mumford made his debut for Shropshire in the 2000 Minor Counties Championship against Wiltshire. Mumford played Minor counties cricket for Shropshire from 2000 to 2002, which included 8 Minor Counties Championship appearances and 7 MCCA Knockout Trophy appearances. He made his List A debut against Devon in the 2001 Cheltenham & Gloucester Trophy. He made 3 further List A appearances, the last of which came against Gloucestershire in the 2003 Cheltenham & Gloucester Trophy. In his 4 List A matches, he scored 42 runs at an average of 21.00, with a high score of 13 not out. Behind the stumps he took 2 catches and made a single stumping.

References

External links
Gareth Mumford at ESPNcricinfo
Gareth Mumford at CricketArchive

1982 births
Living people
People from Bridgnorth
English cricketers
Shropshire cricketers
Wicket-keepers